1357 may refer to

 1357, events in the year 1357 of the Gregorian calendar.
 1357 SH, a year in the Solar Hijri calendar (corresponding to 21 March 1978 – 20 March 1979 in the Gregorian calendar).

References